

Events
January – Alan Bond, the owner of QTQ-9 & STW-9, also purchases TCN-9 & GTV-9 from Kerry Packer for $1.055 billion. The expanded Nine Network becomes the first coast-to-coast network.
January – Long-running ABC music program Countdown launches as Countdown Pirate TV or CDP-TV.
5 January – British soap opera series EastEnders debuts on ABC.
10 January – Final episode of Australian soap opera Prime Time is being shown on Nine Network as the series was not a popular success.
February – Fairfax, owners of ATN-7 & BTQ-7 purchase HSV-7 from The Herald and Weekly Times Ltd for $320 million. The move sees the replacement of most Melbourne-produced programming with networked programming from Sydney, including long-running shows such as World of Sport & sees Mal Walden sacked as newsreader. The revamped news service, read by former STW-9 newsreader Greg Pearce plunges to as low as zero in the ratings.
2 February – Canadian children's series The Kids of Degrassi Street, the first in the Degrassi trilogy series premieres on the ABC.
8 February – American sitcom ALF debuts on Seven Network.
11 February – Australian comedy series Hey Dad...! debuts on Seven Network.
12 February – Australian drama series Rafferty's Rules screens on Seven Network.
15 February – Network Ten premieres a brand new Australian music video program called Video Hits.
16 February – British children's animated series Henry's Cat makes its debut on the ABC at 3:55pm.
16 February – ABC debuts a brand new weekday afternoon magazine series called The Afternoon Show presented by former Models saxophonist James Valentine. The show begins by airing three programmes per day. One show (The Mysterious Cities of Gold) airs weekdays at 5:00pm, one (The Return of the Antelope) airs for only two days and the other three (which includes Behind the News, Educating Marmalade and Earthwatch) will be airing on one different day of the week for the 5:30pm timeslot. The third programme (which is the continuing episodes of The Kids of Degrassi Street) for this show also airs at 6:00pm on weeknights.
26 March – Prime Minister Bob Hawke calls off the proposed amalgamation of the ABC and SBS.
5 April – The infamous Grim Reaper advertisement debuts on television.
6 April – British children's television series Thomas the Tank Engine & Friends (later Thomas & Friends) debuts on ABC at 3:55pm.
6 April – ABC debuts a brand new comedy series called The Dingo Principle.
13 April – ABC weekday afternoon magazine series The Afternoon Show updates its schedule by airing four different programmes on five different days of the week. One show (a brand new Canadian-Scottish drama series called The Campbells) airs from Monday to Thursdays, the other (which is an Australian children's environmental series called Earthwatch now presented by David Smith) now airs only on Fridays, the next programme, a brand new sketch comedy series from Canada titled You Can't Do That on Television airs weekdays at 5:30pm and the last one includes reruns of the French-American-Canadian animated series Inspector Gadget being shown weeknights at 6:00pm.
17 April – The ABC launches its overnight music video block Rage.
20 April – ABC comedy series The Dingo Principle broadcasts a mock interview with the Ayatollah Khomeini, which results in diplomatic tensions with Iran, including the expulsion of two Australian diplomats. Two weeks later, the ABC receives a letter of complaint from the Soviet embassy regarding a skit lampooning Russian figures Mikhail Gorbachev and Vladimir Lenin.
4 May – Australian children's weekday and weekend morning series The Cartoon Connection airs on Seven Network in Victoria for the first time starting off with The Herculoids (replacing The Bugs Bunny Show for Mondays to Wednesdays, The Road Runner Show for Thursdays and The Porky Pig Show for Fridays because all three of these shows aired on Seven only in Sydney), The Flintstones, Tom and Jerry and The Partridge Family on weekdays, Yogi's Treasure Hunt, Paw Paws, Galtar and the Golden Lance (replacing ThunderCats, this show first aired in Sydney in 1986, it didn't air in Melbourne until 1989) and Scooby-Doo, Where Are You? on Saturdays and The Smurfs, The Challenge of the GoBots, It's Punky Brewster and Defenders of the Earth on Sundays.
8 June – ABC comedy series The Dingo Principle airs its 10th and final episode.
25 June – After the ill-fated attempt of the Pirate TV format, the axing of the ABC's long-running music program, Countdown was announced, according to the network's then-managing director David Hill, who has said that the damage was done.
1 July – Neighbours screens the wedding of Scott Robinson and Charlene Mitchell, which later in November 1988 saw the most-watched all time episodes in the UK.
6 July – Reruns of the British children's television series Thomas the Tank Engine & Friends air on the ABC for the first time. This was also the second time the series had been broadcast.
6 July – Debut of British sitcom Executive Stress on ABC.
July – Westfield buys Network Ten from Rupert Murdoch's News Limited for $842 million.
19 July – Countdown broadcasts for the very last time ever with the final Countdown Music and Video Awards from the Sydney Entertainment Centre. In the closing, Molly Meldrum took off his trademark cowboy hat to reveal a bald head, signing off and John Farnham performed "You're the Voice". The last one-hour show was presented by Neighbours stars Guy Pearce, Kylie Minogue and Jason Donovan.
31 July – American sitcom The Golden Girls debuts on Seven Network.
August – New cross-media ownership rules force the sale of the Seven Network. Fairfax sells its stations to Christopher Skase's Qintex company for $780 million.
17 August – The ABC broadcasts a lineup of children's morning programmes for the 7:00am to 10:00am timeslot for the first time.
12 September – Australian gardening and lifestyle programme Burke's Backyard, endorsed by gardener Don Burke, premieres on Nine Network. It was also one of the first of the long line of prime-time "infotainment" and lifestyle programs on commercial television.
26 October – A new Australian children's television series called Kaboodle debuts on ABC.
23 November – American soap opera The Bold and the Beautiful makes it debut on Network Ten at 1:00pm.
24 November – American action adventure series MacGyver makes its debut on Seven Network at 7:30pm.
2 December – American sitcom Perfect Strangers premieres on Seven Network.
27 December – When the new year approaches, Kerry Stokes's ownership of ADS-7 (while owning Network Ten outlets in Perth and Canberra) and TVW-7's ownership of SAS-10, result in the stations deciding to cease broadcasting under swapped callsigns and affiliations. ADS-7 becomes ADS-10 and aligns to the Ten Network and SAS-10 becomes SAS-7 and aligns to the Seven Network.
 Network Ten loses the Winfield Cup rights to the Nine Network after 5 years.

The following quote came from Seven National News reporter Alan Murrell on the 27 December 1987 edition regarding the move:

"Tonight will mark the end of the callsigns ADS-7 and SAS-10. Tomorrow, they be rebranded as ADS-10 and SAS-7. It's the first time such a change has been made. The switch follows a media shake-up earlier this year, which left ADS in the hands of the owners of the Ten Network. Already, the cosmetic changes are being made at Strangways Terrace and Gilberton. But viewers will notice little difference. They'll still turn the knob to Ten for Channel Ten programs, and to Seven for Seven programs.

"The only difference will be that the local personalities will be seen on different channels. So if you want to watch Steve Whitham and Caroline Ainslie reading the news tomorrow night, you simply turn the dial three positions, from Seven-to ADS-10. And it's as easy as that."

Debuts

New International Programming

Changes to network affiliation
This is a list of programs which made their premiere on an Australian television network that had previously premiered on another Australian television network. The networks involved in the switch of allegiances are predominantly both free-to-air networks or both subscription television networks. Programs that have their free-to-air/subscription television premiere, after previously premiering on the opposite platform (free-to air to subscription/subscription to free-to air) are not included. In some cases, programs may still air on the original television network. This occurs predominantly with programs shared between subscription television networks.

Domestic

International

Television shows

1950s
 Mr. Squiggle (1959–1999)

1960s
 Four Corners (1961–present)

1970s
 Hey Hey It's Saturday (1971–1999, 2009–2010)
 Young Talent Time (1971–1989)
 Countdown (1974–1987)
 60 Minutes (1979–present)

1980s
 Wheel of Fortune (1981–2008)
 Sunday (1981–2008)
 Today (1982–present)
 Perfect Match (1984–present)
 Neighbours (1985–present)
 The Flying Doctors (1986–1993)
 Rage (1987–present)

Ending this year

Returning this year

TV movies

See also
 1987 in Australia
 List of Australian films of 1987

References